This list of the Mesozoic life of Georgia contains the various prehistoric life-forms whose fossilized remains have been reported from within the US state of Georgia and are between 252.17 and 66 million years of age.

A

 †Aciculiscala
 †Aciculiscala acuta
 Acirsa
 †Acirsa americana – or unidentified related form
 †Acirsa flexicostata
 Acteon
 †Acteon cicatricosus
 †Acteonella
 †Acutostrea
 †Acutostrea plumosa
 †Aenona
 †Aenona eufaulensis
 †Aenona georgiana
  †Agerostrea
 †Agerostrea mesenterica
  †Albertosaurus
 †Aliofusus
 †Allonia – type locality for genus
 †Allonia decandra – type locality for species
 †Amaurellina
  Amauropsis
 †Ambigostrea
 †Ambigostrea tecticosta
 †Anatimya
 †Anatimya anteradiata
 †Anchura
 †Anchura noakensis – tentative report
 †Ancilla
 †Ancilla acutula
 †Androdecidua – type locality for genus
 †Androdecidua endressii – type locality for species
 †Anomaeodus
 †Anomaeodus phaseolus
  †Anomia
 †Anomia argentaria
 †Anomia ornata
 †Anomia preolmstedi
 †Anomia tellinoides
 †Anomoeodus
 †Anomoeodus phaseolus
 †Antiquacupula – type locality for genus
 †Antiquacupula sulcata – type locality for species
 †Aphrodina
 †Aphrodina tippana
  †Arca
 Arrhoges
 Astarte
 †Astarte culebrensis
 Ataphrus

B

   †Baculites
 †Bathytormus
 †Bathytormus pteropsis
 †Bedellia – type locality for genus
 †Bedellia pusilla – type locality for species
 †Bellifusus
 †Bellifusus angulicostatus – or unidentified related form
 †Bellifusus curvicostatus
 †Bellifusus spinosus
 †Beretra
 †Boodlepteris – or unidentified comparable form
 †Borodinopristis
 †Borodinopristis ackermani – type locality for species
 †Borodinopristis schwimmeri – type locality for species
 †Borodinoptristis
 †Borodinoptristis schwimmeri
 Botula
 †Botula conchafodentis
 †Botula ripleyana
 Brachidontes
 †Brachyrhizodus
 †Brachyrhizodus wichitaensis
 †Buccinopsis
 †Buccinopsis crassicostata

C

 Cadulus
 †Cadulus obnutus
 Caestocorbula
 †Caestocorbula crassaplica
 †Caestocorbula crassiplica
 †Caestocorbula percompressa
 †Caestocorbula suffalciata
 †Caestocorbula terramaria
 †Calliomphalus
 †Calliomphalus americanus
 †Calliomphalus nudus
 †Camptonectes
 †Camptonectes argillensis
 †Camptonectes bubonis
 †Campylopodium – type locality for genus
 †Campylopodium allonense – type locality for species
 
 †Caryanthus
 Caryocorbula
 †Caryocorbula veatchi
 †Caryocorbula veatci
 †Caveola
  Cerithiella
 †Cerithiella nodoliratum – or unidentified related form
 †Chedighaii
 †Chedighaii barberi
  Chiloscyllium
  Chiton
 †Chiton berryi
 Chlamys
 †Chlamys mississippensis
 †Clarkiella
 †Clarkiella hemispherica
 †Clavipholas
 †Clavipholas pectorosa
 Cliona
 †Clisocolus
 †Clisocolus concentricum
 †Columbusia – type locality for genus
 †Columbusia fragilis – type locality for species
  Corbula
 †Corbula subradiata
 †Corbula torta
 Crassatella
 †Crassatella vadosa
  Crassostrea
 †Crassostrea cortex
 †Crassostrea cusseta
 †Crenella
 †Crenella elegantula
 †Crenella serica
 †Creonella
 †Creonella subangulata – or unidentified comparable form
 †Creonella triplicata
 †Cretodus
 †Cretodus borodini
 †Cretodus semiplicatus
  †Cretolamna
 †Cretolamna appendiculata
  Cucullaea
 †Cucullaea capax
 †Cucullaea littlei
 †Cuna
 †Cuna texana
 Cuspidaria
 †Cuspidaria grandis
 †Cyclorisma
 †Cyclorisma parva
 Cylichna
 †Cylichna diversilirata
 †Cylichna incisa
 Cylichnella
 †Cymbophora
 †Cymbophora appressa
 †Cymbophora berryi
 †Cymbophora lintea
 †Cymbophora ochilleana
 †Cymbophora wordeni
 †Cyprimeria
 †Cyprimeria alta
 †Cyprimeria depressa

D

  †Deinosuchus
 †Deinosuchus rugosus
  Dentalium
 †Dentalium leve
 †Detrusandra – or unidentified comparable form
 †Deussenia
 †Deussenia bellalirata
 †Dolicholatirus
 †Dolicholatirus torquatus
 †Drilluta
 †Drilluta distans
 †Drilluta major – or unidentified comparable form

E

 †Ellipsoscapha
  †Enchodus
 †Enchodus petrosus
 †Eoacteon
 †Eoacteon linteus
 †Eopolytrichum – type locality for genus
 †Eopolytrichum antiquum – type locality for species
 †Erguitaia
 †Erguitaia benningensis – type locality for species
 †Erguitaia rugosa – type locality for species
 †Etea
 †Eulima
 †Eulima gracilistylis
 †Eulima monmouthensis
 †Euspira
 †Euspira rectilabrum
  †Eutrephoceras
 †Eutrephoceras dekayi
 †Exogyra
 †Exogyra costata
 †Exogyra ponderosa
 †Exogyra upatoiensis

F

 †Flemingostrea
 †Flemingostrea cretacea
 †Flemingostrea subspatula
 †Fulgerca
 †Fulgerca attenuata – or unidentified related form

G

  Gemmula
 †Gervilliopsis
 †Gervilliopsis ensiformis
  Ginglymostoma
 †Ginglymostoma globidens
 Glossus
  Glycymeris
 †Glycymeris hamula
 †Glycymeris rotundata
 †Goniocylichna
 †Graciliala
 †Graciliala decemlirata
 †Granocardium
 †Granocardium bowenae – or unidentified comparable form
 †Granocardium kuemmeli
 †Granocardium kummeli
 †Granocardium lowei
 †Granocardium tippananum
 †Granocardium tippanum
 †Graphidula
 †Gryphaeostrea
 †Gryphaeostrea vomer
 Gyrodes
 †Gyrodes spillmani
 †Gyrodes supraplicatus
 †Gyrostrea
 †Gyrostrea cortex

H

  †Halisaurus
 †Hamulus
 †Hamulus huntensis – tentative report
 †Hamulus onyx
 †Harduinia
 †Harduinia micrococcus
 †Harduinia mortonis
 †Helicaulax
 †Helicaulax formosa
 †Hercorhynchus
 Heterodontus
  †Hybodus

I

 †Inoperna
 †Ischyrhiza
 †Ischyrhiza georgiensis – type locality for species
 †Ischyrhiza mira
  Isognomon

J

 Juliacorbula
 †Juliacorbula monmouthensis

L

 †Lacrimiforma
 †Lacrimiforma secunda
 †Latiala
 †Latiala lobata – or unidentified comparable form
 †Laxispira
 †Laxispira monilifera
 †Legumen
 †Legumen carolinensis – or unidentified comparable form
 †Legumen ellipticum
  Lepisosteus
 †Leptosolen
 †Leptosolen biplicata
 Lima
 †Lima pelagica
 Limatula
 †Limatula acutilineata
 Limopsis
 †Limopsis meeki
 †Linearis
 †Linearis magnoliensis
 †Linearis metastriata
 †Linearis pectinis
 †Linter
 †Linter acutata
 †Liopeplum
 †Liopeplum canalis
 †Liopeplum cretaceum
 †Liopistha
 †Liopistha protexta
 †Liothyris
 †Liothyris carolinensis
  †Lissodus
 †Lissodus babulskii
  Lithophaga
 †Longitubus
 †Longoconcha
  Lopha
 †Lopha falcata
 †Lopha mesenterica
 †Lowenstamia
 †Lowenstamia cucullata
 †Lycettia
 †Lycettia tippana
 †Lycettia tippanus

M

 Malletia
 †Malletia longfrons
 †Malletia longifrons
 †Malletia stephensoni
 †Mathilda
 †Mathilda cedarensis – or unidentified comparable form
 †Mathilda corona
 †Mathilda ripleyana – or unidentified related form
 †Mauldinia
  †Megalocoelacanthus
 †Megalocoelacanthus dobiei
 †Micrabacia
 †Micrabacia marylandica
 †Micrabacia radiata
 †Micreschara – tentative report
 †Microdontaspis – type locality for genus
 †Microdontaspis tenuis – type locality for species
 
†Modiolus
 †Modiolus sedesclaris
 †Modiolus sedesclarus
 †Molaspora
 †Molaspora lobata
 †Morea
 †Morea marylandica
 †Morea transenna
 †Myobarbum
 †Myobarbum laevigatum
 Myrtea
 †Myrtea stephensoni

N

 †Napulus
 †Napulus octoliratus
 †Nemodon
 †Nemodon eufalensis
 †Nemodon eufaulensis
 †Nemodon grandis – or unidentified comparable form
  Nerita
 †Noferinia – type locality for genus
 †Noferinia fusicarpa – type locality for species
 Nozeba
  Nucula
 †Nucula camia
 †Nucula cuneifrons
 †Nucula percrassa
 †Nucula severnensis
 Nuculana
 †Nuculana rostratruncata
 †Nuculana whitfieldi
 †Nymphalucina
 †Nymphalucina linearia

O

 †Odontobasis
 †Opertochasma
  Ostrea

P

 †Paladmete
 †Paladmete cancellaria
 †Paladmete gardnerae
 †Paladmete laevis
 Panopea
 †Panopea subplicata
 †Parafusus
 †Paralbula
 †Paralbula casei
 † Paranomia
 †Paranomia scabra
 †Parasaurauia – type locality for genus
 †Parasaurauia allonensis – type locality for species
 †Parmicorbula
 †Parmicorbula percompressa
 †Parmicorbula suffalciata
 †Parmicorbula terramaria
 †Periplomya
 †Perrisonota
 †Perrisonota protexta
 Phacoides
 †Phacoides mattiformis
  Pholadomya
 †Pinna
  †Placenticeras
 †Placenticeras benningi
  †Platecarpus
 †Pleuriocardia
 †Pleuriocardia eufalensis
  Polinices
 †Polinices kummeli
 †Postligata
 †Postligata wordeni
 †Praeleda
 †Praeleda compar
  †Prognathodon
 †Promathildia
 †Promathildia parvula – or unidentified comparable form
 †Protarca
 †Protarca obliqua
 †Protocardia
 †Protocardia spillmani
 †Protofagacea – type locality for genus
 †Protofagacea allonensis – type locality for species
 †Protoplatyrhina
 †Protoplatyrhina renae
  †Pseudocorax
 †Pseudocorax affinis
 †Pseudocorax granti
 †Pseudohypolophus
 †Pseudohypolophus ellipsis – type locality for species
 †Pseudolimea
 †Pseudolimea reticulata
 Pseudomalaxis
 †Pseudomalaxis stantoni
 †Pseudoptera
 †Pseudoptera securiformis
 †Pteria
 †Pteria rhombica
 †Pteridophyte
 †Pteridophyte Type 1 – informal
 †Pteridophyte Type 2 – informal
 †Pterocerella
 †Pterocerella tippana
  †Pterotrigonia
 †Pterotrigonia angulicostata
 †Pterotrigonia cerulea
 †Pterotrigonia eufalensis
 †Pterotrigonia eufaulensis
  †Ptychodus
 †Ptychodus mortoni
 †Ptychosyca
 †Ptychosyca inornata
 †Ptychotrygon
 †Ptychotrygon chattahoocheensis – type locality for species
 †Ptychotrygon eutawensis – type locality for species
 †Ptychotrygon triangularis – or unidentified comparable form
 †Ptychotrygon vermiculata
 †Pugnellus
 †Pugnellus goldmani
 Pulvinites
 †Pulvinites argenteus
  Pycnodonte
 †Pycnodonte vesicularis
 †Pyrifusus
 †Pyropsis

Q

 †Quadriplatanus – type locality for genus
 †Quadriplatanus georgianus – type locality for species

R

 †Radiopecten
 †Radiopecten mississippiensis
  †Regnellidium
 †Regnellidium upatoiensis – type locality for species
 †Remera
 †Remera flexicostata
 †Remera juncea
  †Rhombodus
 †Rhombodus laevis
 Ringicula
 †Ringicula clarki
 †Ringicula culbertsoni
 Rissoa

S

 †Scambula
 †Scambula perplana
  †Scapanorhynchus
 †Scapanorhynchus rhaphiodon
 †Scapanorhynchus texanus
 †Scobinidola
 Seila
 †Seila quadrilira – or unidentified related form
 Serpula
 †Solariorbis
 †Solariorbis clara
 †Solyma
 †Solyma elliptica
 †Sourimis
 †Sourimis georgiana – tentative report
  †Sphenodiscus
  Squalicorax
 †Squalicorax falcatus
 †Squalicorax kaupi
 †Squalicorax yangaensis
  Squatina
 †Squatina hassei
 †Stantonella
 †Stantonella interrupta
 †Stephanodus
 Striarca
 †Striarca cuneata
 †Striarca richardsi
 †Striarca saffordi
 †Syncyclonema
 †Syncyclonema simplicius
 †Synodontaspis
 †Synodontaspis holmdelensis

T

 Teinostoma
 Tellina
 †Tellinimera
 †Tellinimera buboana
 †Tellinimera gabbi
 †Tenea
 †Tenea parilis
 †Tenuipteria
 †Tenuipteria argentea
 †Tenuipteria argenteus
  †Thoracosaurus
 †Thoracosaurus neocesariensis
 †Thylacus
 †Thylacus cretaceus
 †Tornatellaea
  Trachycardium
 †Trachycardium eufaulensis
 †Trigonarca
 Trochocyathus
 †Trochocyathus woolmani
 †Troostella – tentative report
 Turboella
 †Turboella crebricostata
 †Turboella tallahatchiensis
  Turritella
 †Turritella bilira
 †Turritella hilgardi
 †Turritella trilira
 †Turritella vertebroides

U

 †Uddenia
 †Unicardium
 †Unicardium concentricum
 †Urceolabrum

V

 †Veniella
 †Veniella conradi
 †Veniella mullinensis
 †Vetericardiella
 †Vetericardiella crenalirata
 †Volutomorpha
 Volvulella

X

 Xenophora
  †Xiphactinus
 †Xiphactinus audax

Z

 †Zikkuratia
 †Zikkuratia tabanneensis

References
 

Mesozoic
Georgia